cAMP-dependent protein kinase inhibitor beta is a protein that in humans is encoded by the PKIB gene.

The protein encoded by this gene is a member of the cAMP-dependent protein kinase inhibitor family. Studies of a similar protein in rat suggest that this protein may interact with the catalytic subunit of cAMP-dependent protein kinase and act as a competitive inhibitor. At least three alternatively spliced transcript variants encoding the same protein have been reported.

References

Further reading